The 2021 Rice Owls football team represented Rice University in the 2021 NCAA Division I FBS football season. The Owls played their home games at Rice Stadium in Houston, Texas, and competed in the West Division of Conference USA (C–USA). They were led by fourth-year head coach Mike Bloomgren.

Schedule

References

Rice
Rice Owls football seasons
Rice Owls football